The 1920 Utah Utes football team was an American football team that represented the University of Utah as a member of the Rocky Mountain Conference (RMC) during the 1920 college football season. In their second season under head coach Thomas M. Fitzpatrick, the Utes compiled an overall record of 1–5–1 record with a mark of 1–2–1 in conference play and were outscored by a total of 116 to 19.

Schedule

References

Utah
Utah Utes football seasons
Utah Utes football